Kiviniemi may refer to 
Mari Kiviniemi, Finnish politician
Kalevi Kiviniemi, Finnish concert organist
Losevo, Leningrad Oblast